Valapad is a village situated in the Thrissur district in the state of Kerala in southern India. It is included in the Manappuram area, and is about 24 km from Thrissur city. It lies by the National Highway 66. The geographical advantage of this village is, in a radius of 25 to 30 kilometers, there are five municipalities and one city corporation. They are Kodungallur, Irinjalakuda, Chavakkad, Guruvayur, Kunnamkulam and Thrissur. Valapad Beach is considered to be a major tourist destination.

Demographics
 India census, Valappad had a population of 34833 with 16404 males and 18429 females.

Trivia
The poet Kunjunni Mash was a native of Valapad.

References

Villages in Thrissur district